Marcus Foslius Flaccinator was a Roman statesman who served as a member of the tribuni militum consulari potestate in 433 BC alongside Marcus Fabius Vibulanus and Lucius Sergius Fidenas. He later served as Pontifex Maximus.

References

Pontifices maximi of the Roman Republic
5th-century BC Romans